Joseph Swanberg (born August 31, 1981) is an American independent film director, producer, writer, and actor. Known for micro-budget films which make extensive use of improvisation, Swanberg is considered a major figure in the mumblecore film movement. His films often focus on relationships, sex, technology, and the filmmaking process, and he is credited with launching the career of Greta Gerwig.

Early life
Swanberg was born in Detroit, Michigan and raised in Georgia and Alabama. He graduated from Naperville Central High School in suburban Chicago and attended Southern Illinois University at Carbondale as a film major, earning a bachelor's degree in 2003. As a teenager, he worked at Hollywood Video.

Career 
In 2005, Swanberg directed Kissing on the Mouth, his first feature film, for a modest budget. He followed it with LOL (2006), which marked Swanberg's first time working with actress Greta Gerwig. Gerwig and Swanberg collaborated on the director's next two features: Hannah Takes the Stairs (2007), which also starred filmmakers Andrew Bujalski, Ry Russo-Young, and Mark Duplass and marked Swanberg's first collaboration with animator and actor Kent Osborne; and Nights and Weekends (2008), on which Gerwig shared a directing credit. Swanberg's next feature, Alexander the Last, was produced by Noah Baumbach, who later cast Gerwig in his 2010 film Greenberg.

After spending all of 2009 working on Silver Bullets, Swanberg finished seven features in 2010: Uncle Kent, Caitlin Plays Herself, The Zone, Art History, Silver Bullets, Privacy Setting and Autoerotic (co-directed with horror filmmaker Adam Wingard). Uncle Kent premiered at the Sundance Film Festival in January 2011 and Silver Bullets and Art History premiered at the Berlinale in February. The rest of the 2010 films premiered theatrically in 2011 after screenings at film festivals. Four of these were later included in Joe Swanberg: Collected Films 2011, a DVD boxed set from the music and video label Factory 25.

In 2012, Swanberg wrote and directed the film Drinking Buddies, starring Olivia Wilde, Jake M. Johnson, Anna Kendrick and Ron Livingston. The film was acquired by Magnolia Pictures shortly after its SXSW premiere.

The following year. Swanberg shot Happy Christmas, starring himself, Melanie Lynskey, Lena Dunham, and Anna Kendrick. This was the first of his films to be shot on 16mm film, rather than digital. The film premiered at the 2014 Sundance Film Festival.

His next film as director was Digging for Fire, which premiered at the 2015 Sundance Film Festival and stars Jake Johnson. The film was released on August 21, 2015 by The Orchard.

Swanberg wrote, directed, and produced Easy, an anthology series for Netflix. The series premiered in 2016 and ran for three seasons ending in 2019. Easy featured many of Swanberg's frequent collaborators from his films, including Jake Johnson, Joe Lo Truglio, and Nicky Excitement.

In 2017, Swanberg and Jake Johnson co-wrote Win It All. Johnson stars with Aislinn Derbez, Joe Lo Truglio and Keegan-Michael Key. The film had its world premiere at South by Southwest on March 11, 2017. It was released on April 7, 2017 by Netflix.

Swanberg is a noted proponent of Internet-based distribution for independent films and has made his 2011 feature Marriage Material available for free on his Vimeo page. He also released his 2020 feature, Build the Wall, starring Kent Osborne and Jane Adams, on his Vimeo page.

In 2021, Swanberg opened Analog Pizza and Video Store, a VHS video rental shop in the back room of Borelli's Pizzeria in Chicago.

Influences 
He cites Elaine May, Paul Mazursky, Lars von Trier, Marco Ferreri, and Eric Rohmer as influences on his work.

Filmography

Film

Producer only

Short Film

Acting roles

Television

References

External links

Official site
GreenCine: "More excited than I have ever been": Interview with Joe Swanberg
indieWIRE INTERVIEW: Joe Swanberg, director of "LOL" 
Filmmaker Magazine: What I Meant to Say

 Joe Swanberg, Hell Is For Hyphenates, August 31, 2014

Film directors from Michigan
Living people
Writers from Detroit
1981 births
Film producers from Michigan
American male film actors
American male screenwriters
21st-century American male actors
American male television actors
American cinematographers
Showrunners
Screenwriters from Michigan
American male television writers
American film editors
American Jews